Cheryl McAfee may refer to:
 Cheryl L. McAfee (born c. 1958), African American architect
 Cheryl McAfee (rugby union) (born 1975), Australian rugby union player